| prevseason          = 2019
| nextseason          = 2021
}}

The 2020 USL Championship Playoffs was the post-season championship of the 2020 USL Championship. It was the tenth edition of the USL Championship Playoffs. The playoffs began on October 10, and originally scheduled to conclude with the USL Championship Final on November 1. The Final was then cancelled the day before because several Tampa Bay Rowdies players and staff tested positive for COVID-19. The championship would not be awarded.

Real Monarchs were the defending USL Championship champions, but failed to qualify for the playoffs.

Qualified teams
Group A
Reno 1868 FC
Sacramento Republic FC

Group B
Phoenix Rising FC
LA Galaxy II

Group C
El Paso Locomotive FC
New Mexico United

Group D
San Antonio FC
FC Tulsa

Group E
Louisville City FC
Saint Louis FC

Group F
Pittsburgh Riverhounds SC
Hartford Athletic

Group G
Charlotte Independence
Birmingham Legion FC

Group H
Tampa Bay Rowdies
Charleston Battery

Format
The top two teams in each group will qualify for the 2020 Championship Playoffs. They will begin on October 10, featuring a single-elimination, 16-team bracket. Under the revised season format, four group winners in each conference will earn hosting rights for the Eastern and Western Conference Quarterfinals. Following the opening round, hosting rights will be determined by regular season record. All playoff matches will stream live on ESPN+ except the Championship final on ESPN.

Conference tables

Western Conference

Eastern Conference

Bracket

Schedule

Conference Quarterfinals

Conference Semifinals

Conference Finals

USL Championship Final 
The Final was cancelled the day before because several Tampa Bay Rowdies players and staff tested positive for COVID-19. The championship would not be awarded.

Top goalscorers

Awards
Goal of the Playoffs:   Jordan Doherty (TBR)
Save of the Playoffs:   Cody Mizell (NMU)

References

2020 USL Championship season
USL Championship Playoffs